Anthony Gillespie Miles (born December 15, 1989) is an American professional basketball player for Al Ahli Tripoli of the Libyan Division I Basketball League.

Professional career
His first professional season, Miles played in the Netherlands for Rotterdam Basketbal College. He finished at the last place in the Dutch Basketball League with the team, but did average 18.8 points per game in the league, which made him the scoring champion.

On January 5, 2014 Miles signed with BC Politekhnika-Halychyna of the Ukrainian Basketball Super League.

On July 27, 2017, Miles signed with Givova Scafati of the Italian Serie A2 Basket. He averaged 19.4 points and 4.9 rebounds per game. On July 8, 2018, Miles signed with Cagliari Dinamo Academy.

Miles joined Pallacanestro Orzinuovi in 2019. He averaged 25.5 points, 4.4 rebounds and 4.3 assists per game in 10 games. On June 1, 2020, he re-signed with the club. Miles averaged 21.4 points, 5.5 rebounds, 3.9 assists, and 1.8 steals per game. On September 5, 2021, Miles signed with Beirut Club of the Lebanese Basketball League.

On January 5, 2022, Miles signed with Lybian club Al Ahli Tripoli of the Libyan Division 1.

References

1989 births
Living people
American expatriate basketball people in Italy
American expatriate basketball people in the Netherlands
American expatriate basketball people in Poland
American expatriate basketball people in Romania
American expatriate basketball people in Ukraine
Basketball players from Houston
BC Politekhnika-Halychyna players
BK VEF Rīga players
Dutch Basketball League players
Feyenoord Basketball players
Lamar Cardinals basketball players
Point guards
Scafati Basket players
American men's basketball players
Beirut Club players